The Rann of Kutch Wildlife Sanctuary is the largest Ramsar site in Sindh, covering , and is located in the Rann of Kutch in Badin District, Sindh, Pakistan. It was declared a wildlife sanctuary by the government of Sindh in 1980.

Description
The sanctuary is supporting nature's richest ecosystem. It provides food and shelter to a number of migratory and local wildlife species. The marshy Rann of Kutch, with its surrounding Thar desert area in Sindh, is one of the most potential habitats for a number of animals and birds in the province.

This area is known to be a breeding ground for flamingoes and staging ground for pelicans, cranes, storks and many species of waterfowl. It is also an important site for animals like blue bulls, chinkaras and desert wolves, which have been sighted over here regularly. The site supports many species of birds and mammals which are locally and globally threatened. The site is also a wintering area for water birds. It is estimated that this wetland regularly supports over 40,000 water birds.

The marshy habitat is most attractive for water bird species such as common teal, shell duck, mallard, pochard, flamingo and pelican. Occasionally, the range of other species has also been seen in the outskirts of the site. These include peafowl, sarus cranes, houbara bustard and the peregrine falcon and saker falcons.

Furthermore, the area has its unique identity among the five famous eco-ranges of Pakistan. Out of seven routes for migratory birds in Central Asia, the Indus green route passes through the Thar desert, making it more important zone from wildlife perspective.

Ecosystem
The Rann of Kutch Wildlife Sanctuary is located in Badin District. It was declared a wildlife sanctuary by the Sindh government in Pakistan in 1980.

This sanctuary is supporting nature’s richest ecosystem. It provides food and shelter to a number of migratory and local wildlife species. The marshy Rann of Kutch, with its surrounding Thar Desert area in Sindh, is one of the most potential habitats for a number of animals and birds in the province.

The area has its unique identity among the five famous eco-ranges of Pakistan. Out of seven routes for migratory birds in Central Asia, the Indus green route passes through the Thar Desert, making it more important zone from wildlife perspective.
The site supports many locally and globally threatened species, including the great Indian bustard, houbara bustard, sarus crane, and striped hyena and supports more than 1% of the biogeographical population of flamingos.

Location
The Great Rann of Kutch is a seasonal salt marsh located in the Thar Desert in the Kutch District of Gujarat, India and the Sindhprovince of Pakistan. It is about 7,505.22 square kilometres in size and is reputed to be the largest salt desert in the world.

Rann of Kutch Wildlife Sanctuary is located in Badin District, Sindh, Pakistan. The Rann of Kutch is geographically the widest Ramsar site spread over 566,375 hectares out of all 10 identified Ramsar sites in Sindh.

Geology
It comprises stabilized sand dunes, some more than 170m in height, with broad inter-dunal valleys of alluvial soil, integral with the large Rann of Kutch across the frontier with India, which includes permanent saline marshes, coastal brackish lagoons, tidal mudflats, and estuarine habitats.. Some 500,000 agro-pastoralists live in 330 villages/hamlets in the site area, and rich archaeological remains include three giant temples dating from 1375-1449. Scarcity of water remains the potential threat to the ecosystem.

Nature

Fauna
This area is known to be a breeding ground for flamingoes and staging ground for pelicans, cranes, storks and many species of waterfowl. It is also an important site for animals like blue bull, chinkara and desert wolf, which have been sighted over here regularly. The site supports many species of birds and mammals which are locally and globally threatened. The site is also a wintering area for water birds. It is estimated that this wetland regularly supports over 40,000 water birds. The marshy habitat is most attractive for water bird species such as common teal, shell duck, mallard, pochard, flamingo and pelican. Occasionally, the range of other species also been seen in the outskirts of the site. These include peafowl, sarus cranes, houbara bustard and the peregrine and saker falcons.ereeere.

Flora
The flora consists of grasses and dry thorny scrub such as Apluda aristata, Dichanthium annulatum, Panicum antidotale, Cenchrus spp., Pennisetum spp., Cymbopogon spp. and Elionurus spp. The large trees include Prosopis juliflora, Prosopis cineraria, Caparis decidua, Ziziphus nummularia, Acacia senegal and Salvadora oleoides  is found in the desert area of kutch.

Threats
Cattle grazing, tree cutting and vehicular traffic are the major threats to this ecoregion's habitat. The proposed expansion of the commercial salt extraction operations will result in disturbances to wildlife, especially to the wild ass population and the, bustards, flamingoes, and pelicans 
Despite the fact that areas in the Rann of Kutch remain largely intact, it is considered vulnerable to development activities such as construction and water diversion projects. Large portions of the Indus Delta have been destroyed as a result of logging for fuel wood and fodder, and grazing.
Scarcity of water remains the potential threat to the ecosystem.

Conservation
WWF-Pakistan and Sindh authorities have carried out work with GEF funding and a management plan is in preparation. This area used to have the only population of the Indian wild ass in Pakistan. Unfortunately they are thought to have been exterminated.
In the past WWF-Pakistan through its Pakistan Wetlands Programme, has conducted baseline ecological studies and has been monitoring migratory waterfowls at Jubho lagoon, Nurri lagoon and Runn of Kutch Ramsar sites.

References 

Wildlife sanctuaries of Pakistan
Protected areas of Sindh
Deserts of Pakistan